Aliabad-e Do (also Romanized as ‘Alīābād-e Do; also known as ‘Aliābād and ‘Alīābād) is a village in Howmeh Rural District, in the Central District of Bam County, Kerman Province, Iran. At the 2006 census, its population was 23, in 5 families.

References 

Populated places in Bam County